Marta Aibeková (born June 22, 1947 in Trenčín) is a politician in Slovakia. Aibeková was a member of the National Council of the Slovak Republic for the Movement for a Democratic Slovakia (CSL) during the election period, 1992-1994, 1994-1998 and 1998-2002.

In 2002, together with Ivan Gašparovič they founded the Movement for Democracy and was one of the candidates for this party in the 2006 elections.

References

Members of the National Council (Slovakia) 1992-1994
Members of the National Council (Slovakia) 1994-1998
Members of the National Council (Slovakia) 1998-2002
1947 births
Living people
People from Trenčín
Female members of the National Council (Slovakia)